This is a list of seasons played by Fotballklubben Haugesund in Norwegian and European football from their first season in 1994 to the most recent completed season. It details the club's achievements in major competitions, and the top scorers for some season. The statistics is up to date as of the end of the 2019 season.

References

Seasons
 
Haugesund